Góra Świętej Anny (all names meaning "Saint Anne's Mountain") is a village in the Opole Voivodeship, in southern Poland.

The village is located on the hill from which its name derives. A popular sanctuary, with a statue of Saint Anne and a calvary, is located on its top.

The settlement lies within the protected area called Góra Świętej Anny Landscape Park. This is also one of the official Polish Historical Monuments (Pomnik historii).

History
Following World War I and the re-emergence of the sovereign Poland, while still part of the Weimar Republic, the hill was the site of the Battle of Annaberg in 1921 during the Silesian Uprisings. A museum dedicated to the uprising was opened in the village in 1961.

In 1940, during World War II, Germans expelled the Franciscans from the village. The Germans established and operated a forced labour camp for Poles, Jews and Soviet prisoners of war, another forced labour camp for Jewish women, and the E111 forced labour subcamp of the Stalag VIII-B/344 prisoner-of-war camp in the village. The village was eventually restored to Poland after the war in 1945.

Main sights 
 15th-century church dedicated to Saint Anne
 17th-century Franciscan monastery and museum
 Calvary from the 17th and 18th centuries with 33 chapels
 Lourdes grotto and monument of John Paul II
 Amphitheatre (Thingspiele) built in the abandoned limestone quarry in 1934-1938
 Granite monument of the Silesian Uprisings by Xawery Dunikowski, 1955
 Lime kiln, middle of the 19th century
 Geological natural reserve in the abandoned nephelinite and limestone quarry
 Museum of the Silesian Uprisings

Gallery

References

External links 
 Jewish Community in Góra Świętej Anny on Virtual Shtetl
 Sanctuary of St. Anne

Villages in Strzelce County